Pierre Jean René Noël Tiollais (born on December 8, 1934 in Rennes) is a French medical doctor and biologist.

He is a member of the French Academy of sciences of the Institut Pasteur and the French Academy of Medicine.

In 1979, in collaboration with Francis Galibert, he carried out the complete sequencing of the hepatitis B virus genome, which made it possible to manufacture the first detection tests and screening for this disease.

In 1985, with his collaborators at the Institut Pasteur, he created a vaccine obtained by genetic engineering (recombinant vaccine) against hepatitis B, prepared on Chinese hamster ovary cells (CHO) . His team were the first to create the hepatitis B vaccine using CHO cells. In 1990, he received the research prize from the Allianz-Institut de France Foundation.

References 

1934 births
Living people
Scientists from Rennes
French biologists
Members of the French Academy of Sciences
Foreign members of the Chinese Academy of Engineering
Physicians from Rennes